Goodenia valdentata, commonly known as Davenport Range goodenia, is a species of flowering plant in the family Goodeniaceae and is endemic to a restricted area of South Australia. It is a subshrub with erect branches, coarsely-toothed, egg-shaped leaves and bright yellow flowers usually arranged singly in upper leaf axils.

Description

Taxonomy and naming
Goodenia valdentata was first formally described in 2014 by Peter J. Lang in the Journal of the Adelaide Botanic Gardens from material collected by "F.J. Badman per W.R.Barker" near Levi Springs Bore in 1986. The specific epithet (valdentata) means "strongly-toothed". The common name Davenport Range goodenia refers to a range in the Lake Eyre region, part of the Peake and Denison Ranges that are part of the Adelaide Geosyncline fold belt, not to the Davenport Range in the Northern Territory.

Distribution and habitat
This goodenia grows on stony or rocky soil in open woodland in the Davenport Range area near Lake Eyre.

References

valdentata
Flora of South Australia
Plants described in 2014
Endemic flora of Australia